Chalkboard is another term for a blackboard, a board to write on with chalk.

Chalkboard may also refer to:

Chalkboard (typeface)

See also 
 Blackboard (disambiguation)